Dendrobium ceraula (horned dendrobium) is a species of orchid endemic to the island of Luzon in the Philippines.

References

ceraula| ceraula
Endemic orchids of the Philippines
Flora of Luzon
Plants described in 1877